Toini Gustafsson Rönnlund (born Toini Karvonen; 17 January 1938) is a Swedish former cross-country skier. She competed in the 1964 and 1968 Winter Olympics and won four medals. Gustafsson also won the 10 km race at the Holmenkollen ski festival in each of 1960, 1967, and 1968. At the FIS Nordic World Ski Championships she collected three medals with a silver in 1962 (3 × 5 km relay) and two bronzes in 1966 (10 km and 3 × 5 km relay). 

For her successes in Nordic skiing and at the Holmenkollen, Gustafsson received the Holmenkollen medal in 1967 (Shared with Ole Ellefsæter). She is the first Swedish woman to win the Holmenkollen medal. In 1968, she was awarded the Svenska Dagbladet Gold Medal.

She was married twice and had a daughter, Eva, born in 1956. In 1968 she divorced her first husband and married Swedish former cross-country skier Assar Rönnlund, with whom she had two more children. They became the second husband-wife team to win the Holmenkollen medal (Rönnlund earned the medal in 1968). Additionally, they are the only husband-wife team to win the Svenska Dagbladet Gold Medal.

Gustafsson is an ethnic Finn. She was born in Suomussalmi, Finland, but was evacuated to Sweden as a Finnish war child in 1944. She retired from competition in 1968 and later worked as a physical education teacher.

She is the paternal grandmother of cross-country skier Elina Rönnlund.

Cross-country skiing results
All results are sourced from the International Ski Federation (FIS).

Olympic Games
 4 medals – (2 gold, 2 silver)

World Championships
 3 medals – (1 silver, 2 bronze)

References

External links

Holmenkollen medalists – click Holmenkollmedaljen for downloadable pdf file 
Holmenkollen winners since 1892 – click Vinnere for downloadable pdf file 
IOC Profile

1938 births
Living people
People from Suomussalmi
Cross-country skiers at the 1964 Winter Olympics
Cross-country skiers at the 1968 Winter Olympics
Holmenkollen medalists
Holmenkollen Ski Festival winners
Olympic cross-country skiers of Sweden
Swedish female cross-country skiers
Olympic medalists in cross-country skiing
FIS Nordic World Ski Championships medalists in cross-country skiing
Medalists at the 1964 Winter Olympics
Medalists at the 1968 Winter Olympics
Olympic gold medalists for Sweden
Olympic silver medalists for Sweden
Finnish emigrants to Sweden
Finnish refugees
Refugees in Sweden